Druzhnaya is a rural locality (a village) in Styopantsevskoye Rural Settlement, Vyaznikovsky District, Vladimir Oblast, Russia. The population was 25 as of 2010.

Geography 
Druzhnaya is located on the Vazhel River, 52 km southwest of Vyazniki (the district's administrative centre) by road. Usady is the nearest rural locality.

References 

Rural localities in Vyaznikovsky District